The Rufiji River lies entirely within Tanzania. It is also the largest and longest river in the country. The river is formed by the confluence of the Kilombero and Luwegu rivers. Its principal tributary is the Great Ruaha River.

The river's delta contains the largest mangrove forest in eastern Africa.

History
A branch of ancient sea routes led down the East African coast called "Azania" by the Greeks and Romans in the 1st century CE as described in the Periplus of the Erythraean Sea (and, very probably,  in the 3rd century by the Chinese), at least as far as the port known to the Romans as Rhapta, which was probably located in the delta of the Rufiji River in modern Tanzania.

During the First World War, from October 1914 to July 1915, the river delta was the scene of a protracted naval operation. These were the attempts, and later achievement, by the Royal Navy to neutralize and destroy the German cruiser Konigsberg.

Basin

Hydroelectric Project

Tanzania president John Magufuli has approved the construction of a controversial new dam and power station on the river at Stiegler's Gorge. The power station is expected to provide 2,100 megawatts of electricity, more than triple Tanzania's existing installed hydropower capacity which is only 562 megawatts. Construction of the dam started on July 26, 2019, and it is expected be ready by 2022.

References

Further reading
 Chami, F. A. 1999. "The Early Iron Age on Mafia island and its relationship with the mainland." Azania Vol. XXXIV 1999, pp. 1–10.
 Chami, Felix A. 2002. "The Egypto-Graeco-Romans and Panchea/Azania: sailing in the Erythraean Sea." In: Society for Arabian Studies Monographs 2 Trade and Travel in the Red Sea Region. Proceedings of Red Sea Project I held in the British Museum October 2002, pp. 93–104. Edited by Paul Lunde and Alexandra Porter. .
 Miller, J. Innes. 1969. Chapter 8: "The Cinnamon Route". In: The Spice Trade of the Roman Empire. Oxford: University Press. 
 Ray, Himanshu Prabha, ed. 1999. Archaeology of Seafaring: The Indian Ocean in the Ancient Period. Pragati Publications, Delhi.

External links
 Map of the Rufiji River basin at Water Resources eAtlas

 
Rivers of Tanzania